Publishers Association of the West (or PubWest) is a trade association established in 1977, initially called the Rocky Mountain Book Publishers Association.  PubWest is a professional organization that is a forum for the discussion of publishing issues.  Members include a wide range of small independent presses, university and collegiate presses, and publishing companies with global operations;  most members are based in the western United States and Canada.  PubWest members include printers, designers, binderies, and publishing freelancers. 

PubWest provides many services and activities for members.  It sponsors a National Publishing Conference and Book Industry Trade Show.  It also has a number of awards programs to recognize outstanding achievements in book publishing. In February 2021, Mirriam Warren of No Nonsense Fly Fishing Guidebooks was elected president of the board of directors.

References

External links
 Publishers Association of the West official website

Professional associations based in the United States